The FIL European Luge Championships 2004 took place in Oberhof, Germany for the third time having hosted the event previously in 1979 and 1998. The number of teams per nation in the mixed team event is reduced from two to one starting at these championships.

Medalists

Medal table

References

FIL European Luge Championships
2004 in luge
Sport in Oberhof, Germany
Luge in Germany
2004 in German sport
2000s in Thuringia
International sports competitions hosted by Germany
January 2004 sports events in Europe